Baldev Singh (11 December, 1942), also known as Baldev Singh Sadaknaama, is an Indian novelist and story writer in  Punjabi-language. He received the Sahitya Akademi Award 2011 for his novel Dhahwan Dilli De Kingre. As of 2012, he has written 55 novels and various short stories and plays.

Early life
Baldev Singh was born in the village Chand Nawaan in Moga district. He started his career as a teacher in the Muktsar area and spent some time in Himachal Pradesh as a teacher as well. Later he moved to Calcutta and worked as a truck cleaner, taxi driver and truck operator.

Career
Singh is known for his novels Sadaknaama and Laal Batti. His novel Sadaknaama was a road narrative of truck drivers from Punjab. It started as a column in Amrita Pritam's magazine Nagmani and was later published as a three-volume novel. The stories in the novel were based on Singh's real experiences. He himself was a truck driver for 10 years, while working as a teacher. The book became very popular in Punjabi literature and "Sadaknaama" became part of his name for his fans.

His novel Laal Batti dealt with the red-light area of Kolkatta, for which he studied his subject for over a decade. It was also adapted into play by Manch Rang Manch, and directed by Kewal Dhaliwal. His novel Annadaata was about plights of farmers in Punjab and is also part of the Punjabi literature curriculum in the Guru Nanak Dev University and Punjabi University. He plans to write sequels to both these books. His play Mitti Rudan Kare also remains popular.

His work Dhahwan Dilli De Kingre was about the legendary rebel Dulla Bhatti. The novel won him a Sahitya Akademi Award for Punjabi in 2011. He recently published a monogram on Giani Gurdit Singh (1923-2007), a noted Punjabi writer, for Sahitya Akademi, Delhi’s, "Makers of Indian Literature" series.

Works
 Sadaknaama 
 Laal Batti 
 Anndaata 
 Dhahwan Dilli De Kingre

See also
 Ram Sarup Ankhi 
 Jaswant Singh Kanwal

References 

Punjabi-language writers
Living people
1942 births
Punjabi people
Recipients of the Sahitya Akademi Award in Punjabi
Indian male novelists
Indian male short story writers
20th-century Indian short story writers
Novelists from Punjab, India
20th-century Indian novelists
20th-century Indian male writers
People from Moga district
People from Kolkata